The Grudge is a 2016 Nigerian film produced by Funmi Holder and directed by Yemi Morafa. The film that is based on relationship and marriage stars Richard Mofe-Damijo (RMD), Iretiola Doyle, Odunlade Adekola and Jaiye Kuti.

Synopsis 
The film revolves around two separated spouses from two different marriages and a widow as they battle to settle an aged long grudge that is creating rift among them.

Premiere 
The film was first premiered on 23 October 2016 at the Radisson Blu, Lagos. Following the success of the first screening, a VIP premiering was held for the cast, celebrities and notable people such as Funlola Aofiyebi, Caroline King, Taiwo Obileye, Elvis Chuks and Hon. Otunba George Oladele at Sojourner Hotel, GRA, Ikeja.

Top cast 

 Odunlade Adekola
 Richard Mofe-Damijo (RMD)
 Jaiye Kuti
 Ijeoma Aniebo
 Funmi Holder

References 

2016 films
English-language Nigerian films
Nigerian drama films